Tolgate or Tollgate is a neighbourhood in north Chennai, India.

Located in Thiruvottiyur, Tollgate marks the northern limit of Chennai District.

Neighborhood
Tollgate marks the entrance to Thiruvottiyur which lies north to tolgate. New washermenpet lies on the south. The eastern region is covered by Bay of Bengal.

Bus terminus
A bus terminus belonging to Metropolitan Transport Corporation is situated at Tollgate. The MTC buses operated from Tolgate to various parts of Chennai city. Bus numbers stops here are : 32A,1,1A, 1B, 1C, 1D,1E,1G,1J,6D, 28, 28B,159,159A,159B,159C,159D,159E,159F,159K,56,56A,56C,56D .
Frequent services are available up to Thiruvanmiyur and CMBT.

Neighbourhoods in Chennai